A messabout is an event where a group of people get together to discuss and "mess about" in boats. The concept is not new but the name is. The term originated in April 1990 when Joe Tribulato organized the first such event with this name. This was the beginning of the Southern California Small Boat Messabout Society, SCSBMS.

The term is derived from the children's book "The Wind in the Willows", by Kenneth Grahame. In the story, Mole and Rat are rowing up the river in Rat's boat. They are discussing nautical things and life in general when Rat is heard to utter, 
Believe me, my young friend, there is nothing — absolutely nothing — half so much worth doing as simply messing about in boats. Simply messing... about in boats — or with boats. In or out of ’em, it doesn't matter. Nothing seems really to matter, that's the charm of it. Whether you get away, or whether you don't; whether you arrive at your destination or whether you reach somewhere else, or whether you never get anywhere at all, you're always busy, and you never do anything in particular; and when you've done it there's always something else to do, and you can do it if you like, but you'd much better not.
Messabouts are usually attended by a group of people who have taken up boat building, boating and all things boat-related as their primary hobby.  While many people have been at this hobby for quite some time, the advent of the Internet has allowed them to network on a level not seen before.  They come from all over to get together for camaraderie. "Messabouts" is replaced in UK especially on canals by "banter" and the emphasis will be more on talk and camaraderie than actually doing anything constructive.

External links
Duckworks magazine, with information on scheduled messabouts.
The Traditional Small Craft Association, with 24 chapters around the USA hosting messabouts to celebrate the virtues of traditional rowing and sailing craft.

Boats
Social events